Kwadwo Nkansah (born 15 April 1987) professionally known as Lil Win, is a Ghanaian artist, musician, actor and comedian. Kwadwo Nkansah was born to Madam Adwoa Afrah and Mr. Kwadwo Boadi Nkansah. He grew up with six other siblings in Kwaman in the Ashanti region. He is the founder and director of Great Minds International school in Kumasi, Ashanti Region of Ghana.

Early life and education 
Kwadwo Nkansah hails from Ahenkro Kwaman, in Ashanti Region of Ghana. Kwadwo could not complete primary school, he dropped out at grade six and was not able to further his education.

Filmography 

Sex Education
Wrong Turn 3
Pleasure or Pain
Once Upon a Time in Accra
Maye Papa Enu Me Ho
Akurase Tumi
A True Life Story
Satan
Condom Producer
Okwantu Ni Mobrowa
Onaapo
Emre Bi
Sure banker
David Ba
Suro Nipa
Aden Ne Otan Hunu
Bone Akyi Akatua
Armageddon
Ensei Me Din
Nipa Nye Nyame
Azonto Ghost
 Obra Twa Owuo
 Abusua Bone
 The Most Wanted
 Y3 Gye Ya Konya
 Sika Mpe Rough
 Amakye n Dede
 Magye Maniso

Music career 

 Mama Boss Papa (Yimama) ft. Young Chorus
 I Don't Think Far (Languages) ft Jupitar, Edem, Tinny, Pope Skinny x Cabum
 Okukurodurufuo (ft Ohemaa X Dadao x Top Kay)
 Pidgintoi ft MzVee
 I Don't Think Far ft Top Kay X Young Chorus and Spermy
 Twedie
 I Don't Think Far (Remix) Ft Guru, Flowkingstone, Sherry Boss & Zack
 Anointing Ft Kuami Eugene
 How Dare You ft Article Wan

Award and honor 
He won "Favorite Actor" at the sixth edition of the annual Ghana Movie Awards (GMAs) in 2015.

He was honored by the United Nations for his campaigns against the illegal immigration in West Africa.

Features

Movies 

 Agya Koo
 Aboagye Brenya
 Kwaku Manu
 Mercy Aseidu

References

Ghanaian comedians
People from Kumasi
Ghanaian male film actors
1987 births
Living people